Robert J. Seneca (1846/1847 – March 31, 1931) was an American politician and merchant from Maryland. He served as a member of the Maryland House of Delegates, representing Harford County from 1896 to 1900.

Early life
Robert J. Seneca was born around 1846/1847 in Havre de Grace, Maryland, to Mary and Dorus Seneca. His father worked in the mercantile industry and worked for the Philadelphia, Wilmington and Baltimore Railroad.

Career
Seneca ran a mercantile business and later bought and sold fish and ducks.

Seneca served as mayor of Havre de Grace from 1889 to 1891. He served as city councilman of Havre de Grace from 1879 to 1881 and from 1890 to 1891 and in 1895. He also served as city treasurer in Havre de Grace for two years.

Seneca was a Democrat. He served as a member of the Maryland House of Delegates, representing Harford County from 1896 to 1900.

Personal life
Seneca died on March 31, 1931, at the age of 85, in Havre de Grace. He was buried at Angel Hill Cemetery.

References

Year of birth uncertain
1840s births
1931 deaths
Mayors of Havre de Grace, Maryland
Democratic Party members of the Maryland House of Delegates